The Three Hostages is a 1977 British television film directed by Clive Donner, produced by Mark Shivas, and starring Barry Foster as Richard Hannay, a retired British soldier who works occasionally for the British intelligence services, Diana Quick as Mary Hannay, John Castle as Dominick Medina, and David Markham as Greenslade. It was based on the 1924 John Buchan thriller novel The Three Hostages.

The story follows Hannay's attempt to recover three hostages taken prisoner by a shadowy criminal organisation.

References

External links 
 

1977 television films
1977 films
British television films
1970s action thriller films
Spy television films
Films based on works by John Buchan
Films directed by Clive Donner